"It's a Shame" is the debut solo single from American hip hop artist Kool G Rap, from his 1995 album 4,5,6.

Background
"It's a Shame" was recorded at Bearsville Studios in Bearsville, New York. In the song, Kool G Rap portrays himself as a heroin kingpin, boasting of his wealth, power and extravagant lifestyle. However, it is implied that he harbours a sense of remorse over his choice of trade, with the chorus (sung by an uncredited Sean Brown) stating:

Now it's a damn shame, what I gotta do just to make a dollar
Living in this game, sometimes it makes you wanna holler

A particularly memorable part of the song is G Rap's description of his mistress Tammy in verse two:

I got a fly ho up under the wing, a swinger that does her thing
And if you step inside my ring, she'll bang it out and make your brains hang
She sits at restaurant tables with mink foxes and sables
Drinkin' Cherenade brand label, she'll rock a sucker's cradle
And yeah, honey is more bounce to the ounce
She walks around with Lucci in large amounts
Millions inside Swiss bank accounts
Her name is Tammy, got a beach house in Miami
Rides around with a small jammy in her silk and satin panties
A down ho, a Foxy Brown ho, standin her ground ho
And if you clown yo, she'll turn into a bust a round ho
Fly as a Heaven's Angel, got sapphires in her bangles
Diamond earrings hang n' dangle, gettin' money from all angles
She's pretty under the New York City bright lights
And real late, way after midnight, I hit it cause the slit's tight

Music video
The music video for "It's a Shame" shows Kool G Rap living a life of luxury as a wealthy and powerful gangster as well as shots of drug addicts and prostitutes, signifying the less glamorous side of the drug trade.

Critical reception
Hip Hop Album Reviews called the song "one of G Rap's premier ventures at storytelling, only weakened by the dime-a-dozen hook".

Samples
"It's a Shame" samples the following songs:
"Love Is for Fools" by Southside Movement

Track listing

12"
A-side
 "It's a Shame" (Original) (4:02)
 "It's a Shame" (Acapella) (4:01)
 "It's a Shame" (Instrumental) (3:54)

B-side
 "It's a Shame" (Original) (4:03)
 "It's a Shame" (Acapella) (4:01)
 "It's a Shame" (Instrumental) (3:54)

CD
 "It's a Shame" (Original) (3:54)
 "It's a Shame" (Acapella) (3:54)
 "It's a Shame" (Instrumental) (3:54)

References

External links
 "It's a Shame" at Discogs

1995 singles
Kool G Rap songs
Songs written by Kool G Rap
Gangsta rap songs
Hardcore hip hop songs
Songs about crime
Songs about drugs
1995 songs
Cold Chillin' Records singles
Mafioso rap songs